The 1979 Holy Cross Crusaders football team was an American football team that represented the College of the Holy Cross as an independent during the 1979 NCAA Division I-A football season. Neil Wheelwright returned for his fourth year as head coach. For the second year in a row, the team compiled a record of 5–6.

All home games were played at Fitton Field on the Holy Cross campus in Worcester, Massachusetts.

Schedule

Statistical leaders
Statistical leaders for the 1979 Crusaders included: 
 Rushing: Larry Ewald, 614 yards and 4 touchdowns on 160 attempts
 Passing: Neil Solomon, 1,046 yards, 70 completions and 5 touchdowns on 144 attempts
 Receiving: Phil Johnson, 662 yards and 3 touchdowns on 46 receptions
 Scoring: Crocky Nangle, 36 points from 6 touchdowns
 Total offense: Neil Solomon, 998 yards (1,046 passing, minus-48 rushing)
 All-purpose yards: Larry Ewald, 1,178 yards (614 rushing, 425 returning, 139 receiving)
 Interceptions: John McNally, 5 interceptions for 19 yards
 Tackles: Steve Gannon, 143 total tackles (74 solo, 69 assist)

References

Holy Cross
Holy Cross Crusaders football seasons
Holy Cross Crusaders football